John McQuade (1912–1984) was British soldier and Northern Irish politician.

John McQuade may also refer to:

John McQuade (footballer) (born 1970), Scottish footballer
Johnny McQuade (American football) (1895–1980), American football player

See also
John McQuaid (disambiguation)
John Quade (1938–2009), American actor